Guillermo Prospero Trinidad Stadium (officially known as Estadio Guillermo Próspero Trinidad which is part of the Compleho Deportivo Guillermo Prospero Trinidad), is a multi-purpose stadium in Oranjestad, Aruba. It is Aruba's national football stadium, named after Guillermo Trinidad, a politician from the same neighbourhood (Dakota). Originally, the stadium was named after former Dutch Queen Wilhelmina, but the name was changed in 1994 after the renovations were completed. The stadium hosts soccer matches and also track and field competitions. It has a capacity of approximately 5,500 spectators. Sinbad performed his HBO comedy special "Nothin' but the Funk" here in 1997.

Football venues in Aruba
Athletics (track and field) venues in Aruba
Trinidad
Multi-purpose stadiums
Buildings and structures in Oranjestad, Aruba